Manakpur is a village in the Punjab province of Pakistan. It is located at 32°45'0N 72°43'0E with an altitude of 726 metres (2385 feet).

Jim Corbett worked here for Indian Railways.

References 

Villages in Punjab, Pakistan